Beta-Ala-His dipeptidase (serum carnosinase) is an enzyme. This enzyme catalyses the following chemical reaction

 Preferential hydrolysis of the beta-Ala!His dipeptide (carnosine), and also anserine, Xaa!His dipeptides and other dipeptides including homocarnosine

This enzyme is present in the serum of humans and higher primates.

References

External links 
 

EC 3.4.13